Kalar Khan-e Bala (also Romanized as Kalār Khān-e Bālā; also known as Kalār Khān) is a village in Poshtkuh Rural District, in the Central District of Firuzkuh County, Tehran Province, Iran. At the 2006 census, its population was 62, in 15 families.

References 

Populated places in Firuzkuh County